Ronald Sartori (23 March 1915 – 1 July 1991) was an Australian cricketer. He played three first-class matches for Western Australia in 1933/34.

See also
 List of Western Australia first-class cricketers

References

External links
 

1915 births
1991 deaths
Australian cricketers
Western Australia cricketers